The Coger House is a historic house on Main Street in Evening Shade, Arkansas.  It is a two-story wood-frame structure, fronted by a two-story flat-roof porch set on a sandstone foundation.  The house was built c. 1870 by Polk Jones, but owned for many years by Claude Coger, owner of the Sharp County Record.  Originally a somewhat vernacular Greek Revival in its style, later alterations (including the front porch woodwork) give the house a more Victorian feel.

The house was listed on the National Register of Historic Places in 1982.

See also
National Register of Historic Places listings in Sharp County, Arkansas

References

Houses on the National Register of Historic Places in Arkansas
Houses completed in 1870
Houses in Sharp County, Arkansas
National Register of Historic Places in Sharp County, Arkansas